Kinrara BK5 LRT station is a Light Rapid Transit station in Bandar Kinrara, Puchong, Petaling District, Selangor, Malaysia. It was the southern terminus for passenger services on the LRT Extension Project Phase 1.

It is operated under Sri Petaling Line network as found in the station signage. Like most other LRT stations operating in Klang Valley, this station is elevated.

The extension is 17.7 km long with 11 new stations and was completed in stages. The first stage of 4 stations was completed in September 2015 and commenced operations on 31 October 2015.

The LEP Phase 2 covering the remaining stations have commenced operations on 30 June 2016.

Station Nearby
 Giant Hypermarket Bandar Kinrara
 Kinrara Oval

References

External links 

Kinrara BK5 LRT Station - KL MRT Line Integrations

Ampang Line
Railway stations opened in 2015